Civil War Museum can refer to:

For the American Civil War:
African American Civil War Memorial, in Washington, D.C.
American Civil War Museum, in Richmond and Appomattox, Virginia 
American Civil War Center at Historic Tredegar
Civil War Museum (Bardstown)
Civil War Museum of Philadelphia
Kenosha Civil War Museum
National Civil War Museum in Harrisburg, Pennsylvania
National Civil War Naval Museum at Port Columbus
New England Civil War Museum
Taggart Hall Civil War Museum & Visitors Center